2-Methylthioethylamine is the organosulfur compound with the formula CH3SCH2CH2NH2.  It is a colorless liquid.  It can be viewed as the product of S-methylation of cysteamine or decarboxylation of S-methylcysteine.  The compound is a ligand and, via Schiff base condensations, a ligand precursor.

References

Thioethers
Amines